Anders "Ankan" Parmström (born 16 February 1942) is a Swedish former ice hockey player and coach, who currently serves as an ice hockey expert analyst on the Canal Plus television network in Sweden.

Parmström served as coach of AIK in the Swedish Elitserien hockey league for eight seasons before coaching the Swedish national team between 1981-1984. As an active player, he represented AIK IF during the 1960-70 season.

"Ankan" (the Duck) Parmström is a familiar profile on Swedish TV, having worked as a hockey colour commentator for both Swedish Canal+ and SVT. He also provided Swedish language commentary for the computer game NHL 06.

References

External links 

 
 Parmström Consulting AB 

1942 births
Living people
AIK IF players
Sweden men's national ice hockey team coaches
Swedish ice hockey coaches
Swedish ice hockey forwards
Ice hockey people from Stockholm